Alexander Aschauer (born 14 March 1992) is an Austrian professional footballer who plays for 1. FC Normannia Gmünd as a striker.

In January 2011 Aschauer was loaned out to VfB Stuttgart until June 2012. After Stuttgart did not take advantage of a contract option to sign Aschauer permanently, Red Bull Salzburg loaned Aschauer out to SV Wacker Burghausen for the 2012-13 season.

References

External links 
 Alexander Aschauer at vfb.de 
 
 Alexander Aschauer at FuPa

1992 births
Living people
Austrian footballers
Austrian expatriate footballers
FC Red Bull Salzburg players
VfB Stuttgart II players
SV Wacker Burghausen players
First Vienna FC players
SC Austria Lustenau players
SG Sonnenhof Großaspach players
FSV Frankfurt players
1. FC Normannia Gmünd players
3. Liga players
Regionalliga players
Austrian Regionalliga players
Austrian Football Bundesliga players
2. Liga (Austria) players
Association football forwards
Austrian expatriate sportspeople in Germany
Expatriate footballers in Germany